The 1979–80 English League North season was the second season of the English League North (also known as the Midland League), the top level ice hockey league in northern England. Five teams participated in the league, and the Liverpool Leopards won the championship.

Regular season

External links
 Season on hockeyarchives.info

English
English League North seasons